Diplecogaster tonstricula, the Eastern Atlantic cleaner clingfish, is a species of clingfish from the family Gobiesocidae which is found in the tropical eastern North Atlantic Ocean. It has been observed cleaning larger species of fish.

Description
Diplecogaster tonstricula, in life,  has a normal ground colour of bright orange on the head and body with thin yellowish or whitish bars which start between the eyes. The colour of the head to the front of the eyes is pale olive with whitish streaking. The eye is pale green with brown barring towards the rear and a yellow ring around the iris. There is a white spot with black margins, like an eye, on the cheek. The fins are orange.

In shape this species has the triangular head, long body and small posteriorly positioned dorsal and anal fins typical of clingfishes. It was classified in the genus Diplecogaster because it has the features that John Carmon Briggs used to define this genus in 1955, these include 31/2 gill slits, a double disked sucker, the counts of spines and rays in its dorsal and anal fins, the lack of an opercular spine and its dentition lacking in incisors or canine teeth.

Distribution
Diplecogaster tonstricula has been recorded from Senegal and the Canary Islands in the eastern North Atlantic Ocean. In the Canaries it has been recorded off the islands of El Hierro, Tenerife and Fuerteventura. It is thought that the species will be found to be more widespread than its current known distribution.

Habitat and biology
Diplecogaster tonstricula has been collected and seen at depths of  mostly where there is hard substrate. This species has been observed to be facultative cleaner of larger fishes such as moray eels and serranids.

Taxonomy and etymology
Diplecogaster tonstricula was described by Ronald Fricke, Peter Wirtz and Alberto Brito in 2015 from types collected near Dakar. It forms a species group with Diplecogaster ctenocrypta. The generic name Diplecogaster is a compound of di meaning "two", pleco meaning "fold" and gaster meaning belly, a reference to the double disked sucker of this genus while the specific name tonstricula is Latin for "little lady barber" and refers to its habit of cleaning larger fish.

References

Taxa named by Ronald Fricke
Taxa named by Peter Wirtz
Taxa named by Alberto Brito
Fish described in 2015
tonstricula